Josef Schneider (born 26 December 1957) is a German cross-country skier. He competed at the 1980 Winter Olympics and the 1984 Winter Olympics.

References

External links
 

1957 births
Living people
German male cross-country skiers
Olympic cross-country skiers of West Germany
Cross-country skiers at the 1980 Winter Olympics
Cross-country skiers at the 1984 Winter Olympics
People from Freyung-Grafenau
Sportspeople from Lower Bavaria